Rathcoole Football Club are a junior-level football club playing in the first division of the Ballymena & Provincial League in Northern Ireland. The club was founded in 2012. The club is based in Rathcoole, Newtownabbey, County Antrim, playing their home games at the Diamond, a two pitch facility that they share with Rathfern Rangers. They gained intermediate status in 2013 and competed in the Irish Cup for the first time in 2015–16, reaching the second round. However the club returned to the junior ranks for the 2016-17 season by dropping down a division. Rathcoole then folded in July 2017 and rebuilt the team and registered themselves again for the 2017-2018 season.

External links
 nifootball.co.uk - (For fixtures, results and tables of all Northern Ireland amateur football leagues)

rathcoolefootballclub.co.uk

References

Association football clubs in Northern Ireland
Association football clubs established in 2012
Association football clubs in County Antrim
2012 establishments in Northern Ireland